Flemingdon Park is a neighbourhood in Toronto, Ontario, Canada, located in the city's North York district. It is part of the Don Valley East federal and provincial electoral districts, and Ward 26: Don Valley East (South) municipally.  In 2011, its population was 22,205. The average income was $66,784.

It is bordered on the north by Eglinton Avenue East, on the west by the Don River (west branch), and on the east and south by the Don River (east branch).  The two branches of the river join at the neighbourhood’s southwest corner. The south border is a parkland access road that used to be known as Old Lawrence Avenue. Flemingdon Park is separated from neighbouring communities by river valleys on three sides, and a light industrial area, now mostly used as corporate offices, next to several railway lines on the north side.

The community is named after its original owner, Robert John Fleming, the Mayor of Toronto in 1892–1893 and 1896–1897, and the nearby Don River.

History

Flemingdon Park was built on farmland owned by Robert John Fleming. After his death in 1925, it was sold to become public land.

In 1958, following the trends of many other post-World War II cities, Toronto began to consider a large planned "apartment city" community for the 1950s population boom and influx of immigrants. Although there was immediate scepticism about the density of the development, the community was nevertheless built.  Occupancy of the new apartments began in 1961, and the community was completed in the early 1970s. The community's developer was Olympia and York.

On September 26, 1969, the Ontario Science Centre opened to the public. It is a major tourist attraction in Toronto. Several commercial high rise buildings were developed in the late 20th century in Flemingdon Park including Foresters Tower, a 23-story high-rise, two 14-storey high-rises ICICI Bank Tower & De Beers Tower. Three residential high rise towers located next to the golf course were built in 1990. Sony Music Canada and Intel Core later acquired the two buildings as its functioning head office.

Like many communities with a significant public housing component, Flemingdon Park has gained a reputation as a working-class community. New development has come, directed at higher-income residents, built mostly along the Don River ravines on the edges of Flemingdon Park. In 2000, this included the addition of a new section of middle-class single and semi-detached housing, and a luxury condominium apartment called "Tribeca", converted from an office building that was originally part of the Foresters complex, along the community’s north side. Townhomes were along the community's east border, in a narrow strip between the Don Valley Parkway and the Don River (east), overlooking the Don Valley, located next to Flemingdon Park Golf Club.

In July 2006, 17-year-old Omar Wellington was beaten and murdered by a couple of young men. This rattled the neighbourhood's residents.

Rochefort Drive has been subject to a number of gang-related shootings and stabbings, instilling fear on residents that live on the low-income block, as well as neighbouring homes and commercial buildings on Ferrand Drive.

A new condo development called Sonic consists of two high-rise buildings of 28 and 30 storeys in height and also includes four-storey townhomes. Due to the development's proximity to Rochefort Drive, which is a low-income block of Flemingdon Park south of the condominiums, it has made the purchase of Sonic suites undesirable.

The Line 5 Eglinton, a light rapid transit line, is expected to open in 2023 with three stops in Flemingdon Park. It will connect the neighbourhood to the Line 1 Yonge–University subway and to Scarborough Town Centre. Plans are being made for a large land development at the 24-hectare former Celestica site at Don Mills Road and Eglinton Avenue to house thousands of people in eight condo towers, and open new offices and shops.

On October 12, 2021, Metrolinx unveiled the interior design of the Science Centre Station, located at Don Mills and Eglinton as part of the Line 5 Eglinton Crosstown Line. Anne-Marie Atkins, Strategic Communications Representative of Metrolinx, said the station is "90 percent complete".

Science Centre Station features a main concourse, as well as an underground concourse with red tiling at platform level.

Redevelopment

Since April 2017, plans to build an additional apartment to the existing 25 Saint Dennis Drive apartment by Preston Group was underway and later approved by the City of Toronto. Residents have continued to advocate against the redevelopment, which includes a 37-storey residential building, on the premise that residents were not adequately consulted with.

Celestica's manufacturing plant, which once sat at 844 Don Mills Road, was demolished in late 2018 to make way for Crosstown by developers Aspen Ridge homes. The site will feature a 100,000 square-foot recreation centre, townhomes, over a dozen luxury condominium suites, and retail spaces.

Demographics

Traditionally, the neighbourhood served as affordable housing for new immigrants to Canada. Today, the neighbourhood's population is mainly immigrants, who accounting for approximately two-thirds of residents (Canada 2011 Census). Though quite diverse in composition, the majority of immigrants originate from South Asia, Southeast Asia, Eastern Europe and Western Europe (Census 2006, Census 2011). Statistics Canada 2011 census has reported that the population of Flemingdon Park consists of residents born in various places around the world, including Germans, Romanians, Kenyans and Sri Lankans.

Community Housing Buildings

Flemingdon Park is heavily saturated with developments and housing projects that are under the ownership of the Toronto Community Housing Corporation. The buildings include:

1, 4, 6 and 8 Vendome Place; 61 and 58 Grenoble Drive, 18, 20 and 22 Saint Dennis Drive.

The buildings were constructed in the early 1960s, and were designed by Irving Grossman. The buildings are made of brick and mortar. Due to its long-standing status in the community, these buildings are slated for demolition in coming years.

Residents over the years have reported "deplorable" living conditions, according to articles from the Toronto Star Leaky roofs, damaged window mesh and unsecure entrances are some of the problems reported.

In 2016, Flemingdon Park went under a series of restoration projects that were intended to prolong the longevity of its community housing buildings. The projects include new fencing alongside apartment units on 1 Vendome Place, as well as the replacement of roofing. Additionally, the Toronto Community Housing Corporation expended funds to restore and renovate its on-site basketball court, located around housing units at 1 Vendome Place; ultimately, its basketball fencing was replaced, picnic bench fixtures were added, and LED lighting was installed around the court to promote safety.

Crime
Due to a large increase in the number of upper and middle-class families moving into the area, crime rates are below-average in comparison with most areas in the city. Police raids have been commonplace in the community in recent years and have contributed to the increase in safety.

Flemingdon Park houses its Community Safety Unit (CSU), operated by the Toronto Police Service and is managed by two Neighbourhood Officers that overlook the neighbourhood. The Safety Unit office is located at the rear entrance of the Flemingdon Park Shopping Centre.

The Toronto Community Housing Corporation, in an effort to deter crime, installed 120 closed-circuit television cameras across Flemingdon Park's low-rise residences in 2006, at a cost of close to $1 million. While cages have been used primarily in underground parking lots to protect cameras from damage, many cameras were vandalized at the time, leaving 22 inoperable.

On July 14, 2006, 17-year-old Omar Wellington, a resident of Flemingdon Park was savagely beaten and stabbed by an adolescent teen gang, stemming from retribution for Wellington not bringing a $1,500 gun back to the gang. Wellington was reportedly stabbed, tortured and beaten to death, and left to tie in a ravine adjacent to the housing complex in which he lived.

On February 10, 2010, four youths, ranging between the ages of 14-17, pleaded guilty to first-degree murder in connection to the death of Wellington. Many witnesses, fearing their safety, did not come forward with tips to police following the stabbing.

In May 2018, Toronto Police raided a series of housing units operated by the Toronto Community Housing Corporation, following a year-long investigation into drugs and firearms that were reportedly concealed in a home. Numerous individuals were arrested by the Emergency Task Force.

Flemingdon Park has seen an influx of police-led raids, following mass seizures of narcotics and firearms in the area. On July 1, 2020, Toronto Police raided a residence in the community, which led to police officers securing a Glock and a .40-calibre handgun.

On July 2, 2021 around 1:00 a.m, a triple shooting took place in Flemingdon Park, wounding three civilians and fatally wounding another. A passer-by, who was believed to have been injured in the shooting, broadcast the ordeal on social media platform Instagram in its immediate aftermath.

Education

Two public school boards operate schools in Flemingdon Park, the separate Toronto Catholic District School Board (TCDSB), and the secular Toronto District School Board (TDSB).

Both TCDSB, and TDSB operate public primary education institutions in the neighbourhood. TCDSB operates two elementary schools, St. Augustine Secondary School, and St. John XXIII Catholic School; whereas TDSB operates three primary institutions, Gateway Public School, Grenoble Public School, and Valley Park Middle School. Gateway and Grenoble Public School provide schooling for students from Junior Kindergarten to Grade 6, whereas Valley Park offers schooling for students in Grade 7 and 8. Valley Park is the largest middle school in Canada, with over 1,200 students, and features a multi-sports field, completed in June 2015.

TDSB operates one secondary school in the neighbourhood, Marc Garneau Collegiate Institute. Named after Marc Garneau, the school was originally named "Overlea Secondary School" opened by the East York Board of Education. The high school offers a "Talented Offerings for Programs in the Sciences" or TOPS program for students in the school that meet its standards. The school has more than 1500 students in Grades 9-12. It has three floors, a greenhouse and approximately 12 portable classrooms. This school is defined to have been built on North York land as opposed to East York, despite the majority of its student population residing in Thorncliffe Park, which is an East York community.

Transportation Minister Marc Garneau makes regular annual visits to Marc Garneau Collegiate Institute, the school in his namesake. Garneau speaks to students about his tenure in space during his 1984 mission, STS-41-G, and educates students on space exploration.

TCDSB does not operate a secondary school in the neighbourhood, with TCDSB secondary school students residing in Flemingdon Park attending institutions in adjacent neighbourhoods. The French first language public secular school board, Conseil scolaire Viamonde, and its separate counterpart, Conseil scolaire catholique MonAvenir also offers schooling to applicable residents of Flemingdon Park, although they do not operate a school in the neighbourhood. CSCM and CSV students attend schools situated in other neighborhoods in Toronto.

Places of Worship

Flemingdon Park is home to several buildings of worship; primarily three churches and one musallah, which are centrally located around many highrise buildings. The places of worship in the community share a wide array of services, and the physical designs of each building reflect different periods in which they were constructed, including contemporary, modern and Anglican-styled designs.

The community is home to the Darul Khair Islamic Centre, which is a privately-operated musallah located within 35 Saint Dennis Drive. The musallah offers Friday Prayers services, known as jummah, as well as Islamic education and schooling for the youth (madrasah), marriage counselling and nikkah services, emotional supports, and Eid Prayers (as a host venue occasionally).

In June 2021, the Darul Khair Islamic Centre was the host for a pop-up COVID-19 vaccine clinic, managed by Michael Garron Hospital.

The Darul Khair Islamic Centre was first established in Flemingdon Park in 2001, and is operated under the support of donations by public attendees.

Following a growing demand for Muslims in the community to attend Islamic education classes that were already full at the Darul Khair Islamic Centre, a second space was acquired with the financial assistance of the public. The space, known as the Lantern of Knowledge, is located at the 29th unit of the Shopping Centre, and is slated to teach both hifz and alim-level courses.

Flemingdon Park is home to The Church of Jesus Christ of Latter-day Saints, on Ferrand Drive, which is southeast of Don Mills Road and Eglinton Avenue. The Flemingdon Park Pentecostal Church is located across the Flemingdon Park Shopping Centre at 5 Grenoble Drive, and the Saint John XXIII Parish Community, which is situated proximal to the Pentecostal Church at 150 Grenoble Drive.

Recreation

Flemingdon Park is home to a number of municipal parks including the Gateway Greenbelt, E.T. Seton Park, Flemingdon Park, and Linewood Lane Park. Many of these parks are situated either beneath hydro-electric power lines, or in the ravine valley of the Don River, a waterway that splits into two parts south of the neighbourhood. The ravine system itself forms a part of the larger Toronto ravine system. A shared use path  situated along the west Don Valley runs all the way to Downtown Toronto. In addition to municipal parks, a city executive 9-hole course "Flemingdon Park Golf Club" was established next to the ravine system in the early 1960s.

The neighbourhood is also home to one community centre, the Dennis R. Timbrell Resource Centre. Community centres and municipal parks in Flemingdon Park are maintained by the Toronto Parks, Forestry and Recreation Division. Other public amenities located in the neighbourhood include the Flemingdon Park branch of the Toronto Public Library.

In July 2019, the City of Toronto created a motion to schedule demolition and revitalization of the Dennis R. Timbrell Recreation in 2025. The motion was passed to conform with the idea of accommodating the growing community's need for a larger community space. Resultatively, the Don Mills Community Centre, which is pending construction on the north-west corner of Don Mills and Eglinton, will serve as the community's new hub in lieu of Dennis R. Timbrell Recreation Centre.

In the early 1970's, a McDonald's was introduced to Flemingdon Park, being situated on the east facade of the Flemingdon Plaza. In 1996, the restaurant was demolished and relocated to the northeast corner of the plaza property, across from the 200 Gateway Boulevard residence.

In 2010, Flemingdon Park began major revitalization of its hydro field and corridor to build a multi-purpose set of fields for various sports. The hydro field now houses several baseball diamonds, a 1000-metre running track and a cricket field. A wheelchair-accessible ramp was also built to make accessibility to the Angela James Arena easier. Prior to the building of the ramp, a large hill of grass was the only method of gaining access to Flemingdon's northern side.

Flemingdon Park Shopping Malls

Flemingdon Park houses two strip mall properties; the Flemingdon Shopping Centre, and the Dongate Plaza, which rests proximal to Don Mills Road. Flemingdon Shopping Centre is the anchor mall, which rests upon a parcel of land under the address 747 Don Mills Road, and is home to major retailers and eateries, some of which include Itamae Sushi, Shoppers Drugmart, Sunny Foodmart, and Scrubby's, the community's laundromat.

In early 2005, VIDEO99 and Monaroza Fish Market, two convenience stores in the Flemingdon Park Shopping Centre, had shuttered their doors and moved out of the community for reasons unknown. The two stores were eventually replaced long-term by owners Sunny Foodmart Group, and Massage Acupuncture.

In 2009, Food Basics, the plaza's anchor store, was demolished following a gradual decrease of both demand and, as a result, profit. The property was soon acquired by Shoppers Drug Mart.

In February 2011, an automotive repair shop that was underperforming in sales and service was demolished in favour of a new mini-shopping centre, which would later become the Dongate Plaza. The Dongate Plaza's first services that were included in its preliminary design included Ariana Pharmacy, Pita Land, and later on a Subways-franchised restaurant.

Calling for a growing need of shopping variety, developers responsible for the Dongate Plaza's construction later built a Tim Horton's approximately 40 feet from the initial zone in which the first three stores were built. The Tim Horton's is a 24-hour, drive-thru-only location.

In July 2014, the Flemingdon Park Shopping Centre underwent major renovations to redevelop the exterior of the plaza for aesthetics and strengthening the structural integrity of the mall, which was aging.
 
In August 2017, a ServiceOntario Leaside location was moved from its original office at 854 Eglinton Avenue East to 747 Don Mills Road. The ServiceOntario office was built in between the plaza's 180 Vape Store and a Delicatessen. The original franchised location, which once sat at Leaside, was moved due to concerns of accessibility for those living in Flemingdon Park, as well as the scarcity of parking, which is a highly-contested issue on Eglinton Avenue, a long stretch of road that is congested with traffic.

Transportation

Three major roadways pass through Flemingdon Park, including the Don Valley Parkway, a major north-south controlled access highway, and Eglinton Avenue, a major east-west thoroughfare that also marks the neighbourhood's northern boundary. Don Mills Road is another major north-south thoroughfare, that splits the neighbourhood into two halves, with the more developed portion of the neighbourhood to the east, and the ravine system to the west of the roadway.

Public transportation in the neighbourhood is provided by the Toronto Transit Commission (TTC). The Toronto Transit Commission is responsible for providing transit to Flemingdon Park. Operating the 100 Flemingdon Park route, it connects residents to both Broadview Station and Eglinton Station. The 100 Flemingdon Park route connects with other routes, such as the 25 Don Mills Line at Don Mills Road and Overlea Boulevard.

The TTC operates several bus routes in the neighbourhood. In addition, the TTC plans to open Line 5 Eglinton, a light rail line to be operated as a part of the Toronto subway system. Line 5 is expected to open in 2023, with three stops planned, Aga Khan Park & Museum stop, Science Centre station, and Wynford stop. All stops and stations are situated along the northern boundary of the neighbourhood, along Eglinton Avenue.

Fleet Trial in Flemingdon Park

In April 2021, the Toronto Transit Commission (TTC) began trialing a new bus fleet on its 100 Flemingdon Park route, among other routes across Toronto that is all-electric. The commission ordered 30 Proterra Catalyst BE40 buses, and operated a select number on various routes, including Flemingdon Park's transportation system.

In popular culture

"Flemingdon Park" was a recurring parody soap opera sketch on Nightcap, CBC Television's late-night satirical sketch shop in the 1960s, which described that neighbourhood as "A cesspool of desire in the heart of suburbia". In 1967, the sketch was spun-off as a six-part series on CBC Television.

The community is often represented in music videos by Kardinall Offishall, who once lived in the community during his youth and teen years. In Offishall's 2010 song, The Anthem, Flemingdon Park makes several cameos, paying homage to his birthing community in which he grew up.

In 2002, the National Film Board of Canada released an hour-long documentary of Flemingdon Park called Flemingdon Park: The Global Village. The documentary was directed by Andrew Faiz, and features recollections, interviews and accounts of residents' experiences growing up in the community.

In April 2018, Flemingdon Park made CityNews headlines for its newly-founded initiative, Friends of Flemingdon Park. The group, founded by numerous residents of Flemingdon Park, aimed to improve youth engagement and dialogue around community issues and promote the betterment of the community.

In local culture

Landmarks in Flemingdon Park are assigned distinct names to refer to the visual representation of a site or phenomenon in the community, or used for the sake of its verbiage in lieu of its official name of identity.

For instance, Vantage Towers, located at 35 Saint Dennis Drive, is known colloquially as the Banana Building, due to the building's curved design and two-tone yellow paint that resembled a banana. However, in early 2020, the building was repainted by its current landlord, Starlight Investments, citing substantive repairs that were done to bring the building up to code.

KIDS ONLY Playground refers to the decommissioned playscape that lies between two housing units on 58 Grenoble Drive. Its official name is the 'TCHC Playground', which is overlooked by the Toronto Community Housing Corporation.

Tuck Shop refers to a concealed, family-operated convenience store that rests on the first floor of 12 Saint Dennis Drive.

The Centre commonly refers to Flemingdon Park's recreation and community centre, officially known as the Dennis R. Timbrell Recreation Centre, located at 29 Saint Dennis Drive.

Sunnies or Sunny's refers to the community's largest grocer, Sunny Foodmart, located within the Flemingdon Park Shopping Centre.

ARK Market (pronounced 'Arc') is a convenience store that is located within the first floor of 31 St. Dennis Drive. ARK Market is a family-owned mini-mart, that usually caters to residents within the building.

The Circle often refers to the P-shaped, cul-de-sac-style roadway that loops around 1 Vendome, 6 Vendome, and 8 Vendome Place.

The Valley refers to the Don Valley River in East York.

The Cage alludes to the private basketball court that is subjugated between numerous levels of compounds on Vendome Place.

Paradise is shortened for Playground Paradise, and often mistakenly (and interchangeably) called Paradise Playground, the community centre located at 150 Grenoble Drive.

The Bridge has dual meanings, with one referring to the Charles H. Hiscott Bridge (sometimes called the 'Overlea Bridge'). The Bridge can also refer to the Spanbridge, adjacent to Playground Paradise.

Notable residents 

Michael Coteau, Canadian politician
Deborah Cox, R&B singer-songwriter and actress
Michael Hollett, journalist, publisher
Angela James, hockey player and Hockey Hall of Fame inductee
Jamaal Magloire, professional basketball player
Kardinal Offishall, hip hop musician
Ian Iqbal Rashid, award-winning writer and filmmaker
Trish Stratus, former WWE female wrestling superstar Hall of fame inductee, was born here before moving out at a young age.
Sean Graham, entrepreneur.

References

External links

Toronto Neighbourhoods: Flemingdon Park
Online NFB documentary Flemingdon Park: The Global Village

Neighbourhoods in Toronto
North York
Public housing in Canada